Michael Redlicki (born 16 November 1993) is an American tennis player.

Redlicki has a career high ATP singles ranking of 351 achieved on 7 January 2018. His career high ATP doubles ranking of 470 was achieved on 8 July 2013.

Redlicki made his Grand Slam main draw debut at the 2012 US Open in the doubles draw partnering Dennis Novikov.

Redlicki played college tennis at Duke University before transferring and playing at the University of Arkansas. Redlicki is also the older brother of fellow tennis player Martin.

Challenger and Futures Finals

Singles: 3 (1–2)

References

External links

1993 births
Living people
American male tennis players
Duke Blue Devils men's tennis players
Arkansas Razorbacks men's tennis players
Tennis players from Chicago
Tennis players at the 2019 Pan American Games
Pan American Games competitors for the United States